Ricardo César Dantas Silva (born 13 August 1992), known as Ricardo Silva, is a Brazilian footballer who plays as a central defender for América Mineiro.

Club career
Born in São José do Seridó, Rio Grande do Norte, Ricardo Silva made his senior debuts with Mogi Mirim in 2010, on loan from América-RN. In 2012, he moved to Ceará, and made his professional debut on 18 May 2012, starting in a 1–2 home loss against América-MG for the Série B championship.

On 7 January 2014 Ricardo Silva moved to Série A club Atlético Paranaense, in a season-long loan deal. He made his debut in the competition only on 7 December, starting and scoring his side's only in a 1–1 away draw against Palmeiras.

On 9 December 2014 Furacão bought Ricardo Silva outright.

On 6 February 2022, FC Seoul announced that Ricardo Silva had a signed contract, a 2 year deal until 2023.

On 3 May 2022, FC Seoul announced that Ricardo's contract was officially terminated by mutual consent due to health issue.

Honours
Ceará
Campeonato Cearense: 2012, 2013

Atlético Paranaense
Campeonato Paranaense: 2016

Atlético Goianiense
Campeonato Brasileiro Série B: 2016

References

External links

1992 births
Living people
Sportspeople from Rio Grande do Norte
Brazilian footballers
Association football defenders
Campeonato Brasileiro Série A players
Campeonato Brasileiro Série B players
América Futebol Clube (RN) players
Mogi Mirim Esporte Clube players
Ceará Sporting Club players
Club Athletico Paranaense players
Atlético Clube Goianiense players
Ituano FC players
América Futebol Clube (MG) players
FC Seoul players
Brazilian expatriate footballers
Brazilian expatriate sportspeople in South Korea
Expatriate footballers in South Korea